Brahim Id Abdellah (born 11 March 1967) is a Moroccan alpine skier. He competed in the men's super-G at the 1992 Winter Olympics.

References

External links

1967 births
Living people
Moroccan male alpine skiers
Olympic alpine skiers of Morocco
Alpine skiers at the 1992 Winter Olympics
Place of birth missing (living people)
20th-century Moroccan people